Brochocin  is a village in the administrative district of Gmina Ciepłowody, within Ząbkowice Śląskie County, Lower Silesian Voivodeship, in south-western Poland.

Notable people
 Friedrich von Logau (1605 in Brockut – 1655 in Liegnitz) was a German poet and epigrammatist of the Baroque era

References

Villages in Ząbkowice Śląskie County